The 1960–61 National Hurling League was the 30th season of the National Hurling League.

Division 1

Tipperary came into the season as defending champions of the 1959-60 season. Kerry entered Division 1 as the promoted team.

On 7 May 1961, Tipperary won the title after a 6-6 to 4-9 win over Waterford in the final. It was their third league title in succession and their 10th league title overall.

Division 1A table

Group stage

Division 1B table

Group stage

Knock-out stage

Final

References

National Hurling League seasons
Lea
Lea